The 2017 Malaysia Super Series Premier was the third super series tournament of the 2017 BWF Super Series. The tournament took place in Kuching, Malaysia from April 4 – 9, 2017 and had a total purse of $600,000.

Men's singles

Seeds

Top half

Bottom half

Finals

Women's singles

Seeds

Top half

Bottom half

Finals

Men's doubles

Seeds

Top half

Bottom half

Finals

Women's doubles

Seeds

Top half

Bottom half

Finals

Mixed doubles

Seeds

Top half

Bottom half

Finals

References

External links
Tournament Link

2017
Super Series
2017 BWF Super Series